Eric Vernon Watson (1914-1999) was a British bryologist.

Watson was born 12 May 1914 in Cranleigh, Surrey, the second of three brothers. His younger brother, Donald (1918-2005) was a Scottish ornithologist and a wildlife artist. His father, James George Watson, was a Scottish banker and financial manager who was away in Africa, so he was raised largely by his mother, Mary Vernon. Eric attended Cranleigh School with his brothers, but in 1931, when his father died, the family moved to Edinburgh and Eric went to Edinburgh University to read Botany (B.Sc. in 1935). He stayed on at Edinburgh to take a Ph.D. studying under Prof Sir William Wright Smith. He obtained his Ph.D. in 1938, his thesis "Studies in the anatomy of anomalous monocotyledons" winning him the Hutton Balfour prize for Botany. He developed an interest in Bryology at Edinburgh, helped by William Young (1865-1947), Keeper of the bryological herbarium at the Royal Botanic Garden. Eric together with his brother Donald were among the first members of the newly founded Scottish Ornithologists' Club in 1933. Eric and Donald  helped to set up a bird observatory on the Isle of May in the Firth of Forth, and Eric assisted in building the first ‘Heligoland trap’ for catching and ringing migrant birds.

After Edinburgh he then worked (1938-9) at Liverpool University as a demonstrator, which is where he met his future wife, Joyce Edwards (1920-2009).  In 1939 he took a Commonwealth Fellowship at Harvard for two years, returning as senior lecturer at Harper Adams Agricultural College, Newport, Shropshire (1941-46). He joined the staff at  the University of Reading in 1946 as a lecturer, later senior lecturer, until he retired in 1979. He would lead bryophyte forays and was also a keen ornithologist, being a founder member of the Reading Bird Club, gardener, golfer, and watercolour artist, exhibiting at the Reading Guild of Artists. 

He joined the British Bryological Society in 1946, became its president in 1964 and then became an honorary member. He was a member of the Botanical Society of the British Isles for almost 50 years.
 
His second book "Structure and Life of Bryophytes", which also went into three editions, introduced the morphology of mosses and liverworts.

He and Joyce were married in 1944 in Ulverston, and had four daughters. He died at his home in Goring from Leukemia, 25 October 1999. His personal bryophyte collection was left to the Royal Botanic Garden, Edinburgh.

Selected publications 
A Study of the anatomy of Trichopus zeylanicus Gaertn. Watson, Eric Vernon (1936). Notes Roy. Bot. Gard. Edinburgh, 93:135-56.
The Mosses of Barra, Outer Hebrides. Watson, E. V., (1939).  Transactions and Proceedings of the Botanical Society of Edinburgh 32:516–541.
The Dynamic approach to plant structure and its relation to modern taxonomic botany. Watson, Eric Vernon (1943). Biol. Rev., 18:65-77.
Further observations on the bryophyte flora of the Isle of May: ii. Rate of succession in selected communities involving bryophytes. Watson, Eric Vernon. (1960). Trans. Proc. Bot. Soc. Edinburgh, 39:85-106.
A Quantitative Study of the Bryophytes of Chalk Grassland.  E. V. Watson (1960). Journal of Ecology, 48(2):397-414
British Mosses and Liverworts. Eric Vernon Watson. (1955, 1968, 1981). Cambridge University Press ISBN  9780521067416
The Structure and Life of Bryophytes. E.V. Watson (1964, 1967, 1971). Hutchinson Universal Library ISBN  9780091093013
Studies of bryophyte distribution since the time of E. M. Holmes: a review with emphasis on the recent literature. (1973). Botanical Journal of the Linnean Society, 67(1):33–46, 
The recording activities of the BBS (1923-83) and their impact on advancing knowledge. Watson, E. V., (1985). In Longton, R.E. and Perry, A.R. (eds.) British Bryological Society Diamond Jubilee. British Bryological Society Special Volume Number 1. 17-29. Cardiff.

References 

1914 births
1999 deaths
People from Cranleigh
Bryologists
British botanists
People educated at Cranleigh School
Academics of the University of Reading
Alumni of the University of Edinburgh